The Ocean Cleanup is a nonprofit environmental engineering organization based in the Netherlands, that develops technology to extract plastic pollution from the oceans and intercept it in rivers before it can reach the ocean. After initial testing and prototyping in the North Sea they deployed their first full-scale prototype in the Great Pacific Garbage Patch. It ran into difficulty after two months and was towed to Hawaii for inspection and repair. In June 2019, their second prototype system was deployed. They also deployed their river technology, the Interceptor, in two locations in 2019, revealed the project publicly in October 2019, and deployed another in 2020. In 2021, they announced that the prototype testing of System 002 was successful. In 2022, the first Interceptor Original deployed in the United States was installed at Ballona Creek near Los Angeles, California.

The organization conducts scientific research into oceanic plastic pollution. It was founded in 2013 by Boyan Slat, a Dutch-born inventor-entrepreneur of Croatian and Dutch origin who serves as its CEO. It has conducted two expeditions to the North Pacific Gyre, the Mega Expedition and the Aerial Expedition, and continues to publish scientific papers. Their ocean system consists of a floating barrier at the surface of the water in the oceanic gyres, that collects marine debris as the system is pushed by wind, waves and current, and slowed down by a sea anchor. The project aims to launch a total of 60 such systems, and they predict this capability could clean up 50% of the debris in the Great Pacific Garbage Patch in five years from full scale deployment.

In late October 2019, the organization announced a new initiative, the Interceptor, which would aim to drastically reduce the amount of plastic flowing into the oceans from rivers, with Slat explaining how "1% of rivers are responsible for 80% of the pollution in the world's seas".

History 

Boyan Slat proposed the cleanup project and supporting system in 2012. In October, Slat outlined the project in a TED-talk. The initial design consisted of long, floating barriers fixed to the seabed, attached to a central platform shaped like a manta ray for stability. The barriers would direct the floating plastic to the central platform, which would remove the plastic from the water. Slat did not specify the dimensions of this system in the talk.

2014 
In 2014, the design was revised, replacing the central platform with a tower detached from the floating barriers. This platform would collect the plastic using a conveyor belt. The floating barrier was proposed to be 100 km long. They also conducted and published their feasibility study. In 2015, this design won the London Design Museum Design of the Year, and the INDEX: Award.

2015 
In 2015, scale model tests were conducted in controlled environments. Tests took place in wave pools at Deltares and MARIN. The purpose was to test the dynamics and load of the barrier, when exposed to currents and waves, and to gather data for continued computational modeling.

2016  
A 100-metre segment went through a test in the North Sea, off the coast of the Netherlands in the summer of 2016. The purpose was to test the endurance of the materials chosen and the connections between elements. The test indicated that conventional oil containment booms could not endure the harsh environments the system would face. They changed the floater material to a hard-walled HDPE pipe, which is flexible enough to follow the waves, and rigid enough to maintain its open U-shape. More prototypes were deployed to test component endurance.

On May 11, 2017, The Ocean Cleanup announced new design changes and their plan to test their new drifting system in the North Pacific in 2017.

2017 
In May 2017, significant changes to the design were made:

The Ocean Cleanup suggested using a fleet of approximately 60 such systems.
 The seabed anchors were replaced with sea anchors, allowing it to drift with the currents, but moving more slowly. This allowed the plastic to "catch up" with the cleanup system. The lines to the anchor would keep the system in a U-shape. This design allows the system to drift to locations with the highest concentration of debris.
 An automatic system for collecting the plastic was dropped. Instead, the system would concentrate the plastic before removal by support vessels.

2018 
The Ocean Cleanup performed more scale model tests in 2018. The sea anchors were removed because the wind moved the system faster than the plastic. The opening of the U would face the direction of travel, which would be achieved by having the underwater screen deeper in the middle of the system, creating more drag.

On September 9, 2018, System 001 (nicknamed Wilson in reference to the floating volleyball in the 2000 film Cast Away) deployed from San Francisco. The ship Maersk Launcher towed the system to a position 240 nautical miles off the coast, where it was put through a series of sea trials. It is made from HDPE, and consists of 50x12 m sections joined. It was unmanned and incorporates solar-powered monitoring and navigation systems, including GPS, cameras, lanterns and AIS. The barrier and the screen mounting were produced in Austria by an Austrian supplier.

When the tests were complete, and the organization deemed it okay to move forward, it was towed to the Great Pacific Garbage Patch for real-world duty. It arrived on October 16, 2018, and was deployed in operational configuration. System 001 encountered difficulties retaining the plastic collected. The system collected debris, but soon lost it because the barrier did not retain a consistent speed through the water.

In November, the project attempted to widen the mouth of the U by 60-70m but failed. In late December, mechanical stress caused an 18-meter section to detach. Shortly thereafter, the rig began its journey to Hawaii for inspection and repair. During the two months of operation, the system had captured some 2,000 kg of plastic.

2019 
 
In mid-January 2019, the Wilson system completed its 800-mile journey and arrived in Hilo Bay, Hawaii. The Ocean Cleanup planned to return the repaired system to duty by summer. In mid-June, after four months of root cause analyses and redesign, a new revamped testing system (001/B) was deployed. In August, the team announced that after trying multiple alternatives, a water-borne parachute attached to slow the system, and expanding the cork line used to hold the screen in place would be tested. In October they announced that the new system successfully captured and collected plastic, and even microplastics. The model was also more efficient and smaller, making offshore adjustments possible.

In June 2019, they deployed System 001/B, a smaller test system. They tested speeding up the system with a string of inflatable buoys installed across the system's opening, and slowing down the system with a parachute sea anchor. The sea anchor was found to best capture plastic. This edition used simpler connections between the barrier and skirt, eliminated stabilizing structures and reduced the barrier size by two-thirds.

In October, The Ocean Cleanup unveiled their new river cleanup technology, The Interceptor, the first scalable solution to intercept river plastic and prevent it from reaching the ocean. Two systems were deployed in Jakarta (Indonesia) and Klang (Malaysia).

2020 

In January, extreme flooding broke the barrier of Interceptor 001 in Jakarta. Although this was part of the design to reduce the force on the whole structure, the barrier was replaced with a newer model that has a stronger screen, simpler design, and an adjustable better-defined weak link.

In August, the third Interceptor was deployed in Santo Domingo, in the Dominican Republic.

In December, The Ocean Cleanup announced that production of the Interceptor series was to begin for global scale-up.

On October 24, they launched their first product made from plastic from the Great Pacific Garbage Patch (GPGP), The Ocean Cleanup sunglasses, with funding going to their continued cleanup. They worked with DNV GL to develop a certification for plastic from water sources and the sunglasses were certified to originate from the GPGP.

2021 
In July 2021, a new design called System 002, also known as "Jenny", was deployed in the Great Pacific Garbage Patch for testing. In October, the organization announced that the system had gathered  of trash. In October, the project announced plans for System 003, which will span .

2022 

In July 2022, the Ocean Cleanup announced that an Interceptor Original would be deployed near the mouth of Ballona Creek in southwestern Los Angeles County, California. It is the first Interceptor Original installed in the United States, and the second 3rd generation Interceptor Original to be deployed globally. On 25 July 2022, the project announced that it had removed more than 100,000 kg of plastic from the Great Pacific Garbage Patch using its "System 002" and announced the beginning of its transition to the new "System 03", purportedly 10 times as effective as its predecessor.

Design

Ocean system 

The latest Jenny design uses a towed, floating structure. The structure acts as a containment boom. A permeable screen underneath the float catches subsurface debris. It incorporated an  barrier and added active propulsion to allow the system to operate at higher speed. Crewed boats tow the U-shaped barrier through the water at 1.5 knots. The ship can also be steered to areas with higher waste densities. In July 2022, the floating system reached the milestone of 100,000 kg of plastic removed from the Great Pacific Garbage Patch.

River system 
The Interceptor is a solar-powered, automated system designed to capture and extract waste. Along with an optimized water flow path, a barrier guides rubbish towards the opening of the Interceptor and onto the conveyor belt, which delivers waste to the shuttle. The shuttle deposits the waste equally into one of six bins according to sensors. When the bins are almost full, local operators are informed with an automated message, who then empty them and send the waste to local waste management facilities. The Interceptor project is similar to a smaller-scale local project called Mr. Trash Wheel developed in Maryland's Baltimore harbor. In 2021, The Ocean Cleanup announced they are expanding their portfolio of Interceptor technologies to be able to tackle a wider range of rivers.

System deployments

Research

Oceanic expeditions 

In August 2015, The Ocean Cleanup conducted its so-called Mega Expedition, in which a fleet of approximately 30 vessels, including lead ship R/V Ocean Starr, crossed the Great Pacific Garbage Patch and mapped an area of 3.5 million square kilometers. The expedition collected data on the size, concentration and total mass of the plastic in the patch. According to the organization, this expedition collected more data on oceanic plastic pollution than the last 40 years combined.

In September and October 2016, The Ocean Cleanup launched its Aerial Expedition, in which a C-130 Hercules aircraft conducted the first ever series of aerial surveys to map the Great Pacific Garbage Patch. The goal was specifically to quantify the amount of large debris, including ghosts nets in the patch. Slat stated that the crew saw a lot more debris than expected.

The project released an app called The Ocean Cleanup Survey App, which enables others to survey the ocean for plastic, and report their observations to The Ocean Cleanup.

Scientific findings 
In February 2015, the research team published a study in Biogeosciences about the vertical distribution of plastic, based on samples collected in the North Atlantic Gyre. They found that the plastic concentration decreases exponentially with depth, with the highest concentration at the surface, and approaching zero just a few meters deeper. A follow-up paper was published in Scientific Reports in October 2016.

In June 2017, researchers published a paper in Nature Communications, with a model of the river plastic input into the ocean. Their model estimates that between 1.15 and 2.41 million metric tonnes of plastic enter the world's oceans every year, with 86% of the input stemming from rivers in Asia.

In December 2017, they published a paper in Environmental Science & Technology about pollutants in oceanic plastic, based upon data from the Mega Expedition. They found that 84% of their plastic samples had at least one persistent organic pollutant in them exceeding safe levels. Furthermore, they found 180 times more plastic than naturally occurring biomass on the surface in the Great Pacific Garbage Patch.

On March 22, 2018, The Ocean Cleanup published a paper in Scientific Reports, summarizing the combined findings from the Mega- and Aerial Expedition. They estimate that the Patch contains 1.8 trillion pieces of floating plastic, with a total mass of 79,000 metric tonnes. Microplastics (< 0.5 cm) make up 94% of the pieces, accounting for 8% of the mass. The study suggests that the amount of plastic in the patch increased exponentially since 1970.

In September 2019, they published a paper in Scientific Reports looking into the explanation of why emissions into the ocean are higher than the debris accumulated at the surface layer of the ocean. They argue that debris circulation dynamics can offer an explanation for this missing plastic and suggest that there is a significant amount of time between the initial emissions and accumulation offshore. The study indicates that current microplastics are mostly a result of the degradations of plastic produced in the 1990s or before.

In October 2019, when research revealed most ocean plastic pollution comes from Chinese cargo ships, a spokesperson from The Ocean Cleanup said: "Everyone talks about saving the oceans by stopping using plastic bags, straws and single use packaging. That's important, but when we head out on the ocean, that's not necessarily what we find."

In May 2020, they released a paper in Scientific Reports showing that part of the plastic at the surface of the Great Pacific Garbage Patch is breaking down into microplastics and sinking to the deep sea. Most debris is still found at the surface, with 90% in the first 5 meters.

Funding 
The Ocean Cleanup raised over 2 million USD with the help of a crowdfunding campaign in 2014. The Ocean Cleanup is mainly funded by donations and in-kind sponsors, including Maersk, Salesforce.com chief executive Marc Benioff, Peter Thiel, Julius Baer Foundation, The Coca-Cola Company and Royal DSM.

In October 2020, they unveiled their first product made from plastic certified from the Great Pacific Garbage Patch, The Ocean Cleanup sunglasses, to help fund the continuation of the cleanup. Each pair of glasses sold would allow for the cleaning efforts of an area the size of 24 football fields, with a total of 500,000 football fields to be cleaned from the proceeds of about 21,000 sunglasses. The sunglasses were designed by Yves Béhar and manufactured by Safilo and sold out in early 2022.

In 2022, Kia signs a seven-year deal to become a global partner of The Ocean Cleanup through funding and in-kind contributions. The partnership will fund the construction of an Interceptor Original and will allow for recycled plastics to be used in the manufacturing process of Kia.

In early 2023 the organization received the largest private donation to date of $25 million by Joe Gebbia co-founder of Airbnb and Samara allowing the organization to further fund scientific research, cleanup operations, and the launch of System 03.

Criticism 
Criticisms and doubts about method, feasibility, efficiency and return on investment have been raised in the scientific community about the project. These include: 
 Miriam Goldstein, director of ocean policy at the Center for American Progress, whose Ph.D. covered the Pacific Garbage Patch, stated that devices closer to shore are easier to maintain, and would likely recover more plastic per dollar spent overall.
 The device could imperil sea life. In particular, the gyres host neustons, communities of pleustons, Portuguese man-of-war, sea snails, and the sail jellyfish that live near the ocean surface.
The approach by itself cannot solve the whole problem. Plastic in the oceans is spread far beyond the gyres; experts estimate that less than 5% of all the plastic pollution which enters the oceans makes its way into any of the garbage patches. Much of the plastic that does is not floating at the surface.

Recognition

The project and its founder have been recognized in many fora.

 2014 Champion of the Earth – The United Nations Environment Programme.
 One of the 20 Most Promising Young Entrepreneurs Worldwide – Intel EYE50. 
 2015 Maritime Young Entrepreneur Award.
 In 2015, the Array was named as a London Design Museum Design of the Year. 
 2015 INDEX: Award. 
 2015 Fast Company Innovation By Design Award in the category Social Good. 
 2015 100 Global Thinkers 0 Foreign Policy. 
 2016 Katerva award. 
 2017 Norwegian Shipowners' Association's Thor Heyerdahl award.

See also

References

Further reading

External links

 
 

Ocean pollution
Plastics and the environment
Litter
Organisations based in South Holland
Conservation and environmental foundations
Environmental organizations established in 2013